Lincoln College may refer to:

in Australia
 Lincoln College (University of Adelaide), a residential College of the University of Adelaide

in Malaysia
 Lincoln University College, Malaysia, a private higher education institution formerly known as Lincoln College

in New Zealand
 Lincoln University, New Zealand, formerly called Lincoln College (1961–1990)

in the United Kingdom
 Lincoln College, Oxford, a constituent college of the University of Oxford
 Lincoln College, Lincolnshire, a further education college in Lincolnshire

in the United States
 Lincoln College (Illinois), a private institution with campuses in Lincoln and Normal, Illinois
 Lincoln College of New England, a for-profit associates' college in Southington, Connecticut
 Lincoln Land Community College, Springfield, Illinois
 Lincoln College, former name of Washburn University, Kansas
 Lincoln Technical Institute, also known as Lincoln Tech, and part of the Lincoln Group of Schools
 Lincoln College of Technology, part of the Lincoln Group of Schools

See also
Lincoln School (disambiguation)
Lincoln University (disambiguation)
University of Lincoln, in the United Kingdom
Lincoln Institute (disambiguation)
Morrill Land-Grant Colleges Act; schools created this way are sometimes called Lincoln Colleges, since Lincoln signed the first Morrill Act
Lincoln Group of Schools